Bruno Banducci (November 11, 1921 – September 15, 1985) was an Italian, American football offensive lineman in the National Football League for the Philadelphia Eagles and the San Francisco 49ers. Banducci played college football at Stanford University and was drafted in the sixth round of the 1943 NFL Draft. He earned a Pro Bowl nomination in 1954 and named an Associated Press first-team All Pro in 1947 and 1954. Banducci is also a member of the Delta Chi Fraternity.

After retiring from professional football, he taught high school math at Marin Catholic High School in Kentfield, California, USA and Sonoma Valley High School in Sonoma, California, USA.

The Professional  Football Researchers Association named Banducci to the PRFA Hall of Very Good Class of 2009

References

External links

1921 births
1985 deaths
Italian emigrants to the United States
Italian players of American football
American football offensive guards
Philadelphia Eagles players
San Francisco 49ers (AAFC) players
San Francisco 49ers players
Stanford Cardinal football players
Western Conference Pro Bowl players
Richmond High School (Richmond, California) alumni